Forså is a village in Ibestad Municipality in Troms og Finnmark county, Norway.  The village is located along the Astafjorden on the south side of the island of Rolla, about half-way between the villages of Sørrollnes and Hamnvik.

References

Villages in Troms
Ibestad
Populated places of Arctic Norway